The 2019 North Alabama Lions football team represented the University of North Alabama during the 2019 NCAA Division I FCS football season. They were led by third-year head coach Chris Willis. The Lions played their home games at Braly Municipal Stadium as a first-year member of the Big South Conference. They finished the season 4–7, 3–4 in Big South play, however due to their transition to NCAA Division I, their official conference record is 0–0.

Previous season

The Lions finished the 2018 season with a record of 7–3, competing as an FCS independent.

Preseason

Big South poll
The Big South preseason poll was released on July 21, 2019. Due to their transition to NCAA Division I, North Alabama was not ranked.

Preseason All–Big South team
The Lions had one player selected to the preseason all-Big South team.

Offense

Jakobi Byrd – WR

Schedule

Game summaries

Western Illinois

at Montana

Alabama A&M

at Jacksonville State

Presbyterian

at Hampton

Charleston Southern

at Kennesaw State

Campbell

at Monmouth

at Gardner–Webb

References

North Alabama
North Alabama Lions football seasons
North Alabama Lions football